The Beginning is a 1970 Soviet romantic drama film directed by Gleb Panfilov and starring Inna Churikova as Pasha, a factory worker and small-time actress whose life is transformed first by falling in love with the married Arkady (Leonid Kuravlyov) and then by being offered the lead in a movie about Joan of Arc.

Cast
Inna Churikova - Pasha Stroganova
Leonid Kuravlyov - Arkady, beloved of Pasha
Valentina Telichkina - Valya, a friend of Pasha
Tatiana Stepanova - Katya, a friend of Pasha
Mikhail Kononov - Pavlik, neighbor of Pasha
Nina Skomorokhova - Zina, wife of Arkady
Tatiana Bedova - Toma, bride of Pavlik
Yuri Klepikov - Fedor Vasilyevich Ignatiev, director
Gennady Beglov - Vitaly Alekseevich Odinokov, the second director
Yuri Vizbor - Stepan Ivanovich, writer
Vyacheslav Vasilyev - Stepan Vitalievich, assistant director
Yevgeni Lebedev - Pierre Cauchon (voiced by Yefim Kopelyan)

References

External links
 
 Description and press cuttings on Gleb Panfilov homepage
«Начало»: рецензия 

1970 films
1970 romantic drama films
Soviet romantic drama films
Russian romantic drama films
1970s Russian-language films
Soviet black-and-white films
Films directed by Gleb Panfilov
Films about filmmaking
Russian black-and-white films